Saint-Augustin-de-Woburn, known locally as Woburn, is a parish municipality in Le Granit Regional County Municipality in the Estrie region of Quebec, Canada. The population is 695 as of the Canada 2011 Census. A parish municipality is the territory of a parish established as a municipality.

Settlement began around 1880.

It is 5 km from Canada–United States border and the Coburn Gore-Woburn Border Crossing.

Demographics 

See also
Types of municipalities in Quebec

References

External links

Parish municipalities in Quebec
Incorporated places in Estrie
Le Granit Regional County Municipality